Claudine Uwera is Rwandan Politician and Economist who currently serves as Minister of State in Charge of Economic Planning in the Ministry of Finance and Economic Planning in Rwanda since 2018. Prior of appointment, she was the Coordinator of the Natural Capital Accounting Program (NCA).

Educations 
Claudine is an economist specializing in Environmental Economics; she  pursued her PhD studies in  Department of Economics, University of Gothenburg in Sweden from 2008 to 2013, and she taught at the University of Rwanda, School of Economics for more than 10 years.

References 

Women government ministers of Rwanda
Government ministers of Rwanda
Living people
Year of birth missing (living people)